Groove Merchant is an album by saxophonist Jerome Richardson, featuring jazz versions of then-current pop hits, recorded in 1967 and released on the Verve label the following year.

Track listing 
 "Groove Merchant" (Jerome Richardson) – 5:58
 "To Sir with Love" (Mark London, Don Black) – 3:08
 "Gimmie Little Sign" (Alfred Smith, Jerry Winn, Joseph Hooven) – 2:20
 "No Matter What Shape (Your Stomach's In)" (Granville "Sascha" Burland) – 2:27
 "Girl, You'll Be a Woman Soon" (Neil Diamond) – 2:34
 "Knock on Wood" (Steve Cropper, Eddie Floyd) – 2:35
 "Ode to Billie Joe" (Bobbie Gentry) – 2:58
 "Sunny" (Bobby Hebb) – 3:40
 "Where Is Love" (Richardson) – 3:30
 "Up, Up and Away" (Jimmy Webb) – 3:56

Personnel 
Jerome Richardson – tenor saxophone, soprano saxophone, flute, bass flute
Joe Newman, Snooky Young – trumpet
Alan Raph – trombone
Buddy Lucas – baritone saxophone, harmonica
Ernie Hayes – piano, organ
Eric Gale, Carl Lynch – guitar
Chuck Rainey – electric bass
Grady Tate – drums
Warren Smith – percussion
Benny Golson – arranger, conductor

References 

1968 albums
Jerome Richardson albums
Verve Records albums
Albums produced by Esmond Edwards
Albums arranged by Benny Golson
Albums conducted by Benny Golson
Albums recorded at Van Gelder Studio